The John M. Fleming Home Place, also known as Duke Farm, is a historic mansion in Collierville, Tennessee, U.S..

History
The house was built circa 1850 for a South Carolinian couple, John M. Fleming and his wife Eliza Moseley. By 1850, they owned 13 male slaves and 11 female slaves. The grounds included a slave cemetery from 1851 to 1935. After the American Civil War of 1861–1865, slaves were replaced by sharecroppers. Fleming's son, Samuel T. Fleming, lived on the property until 1913, and it was purchased by the Duke family in 1924. The Dukes used sharecroppers until the 1960s.

The house has been listed on the National Register of Historic Places since December 6, 1990.

References

Houses on the National Register of Historic Places in Tennessee
Greek Revival architecture in Tennessee
Italianate architecture in Tennessee
Houses completed in 1850
Houses in Shelby County, Tennessee
Historic districts on the National Register of Historic Places in Tennessee
National Register of Historic Places in Shelby County, Tennessee